The Bajo, Bajonese, Bajonesian, or Wajo, Wajonese are the indigenous Indonesian ethnic group native to the Bajo Island of Lesser Sunda Islands (Nusa Tenggara) in Indonesia. These ethnic group can be found all across the Flores Sea to the northeastern Bali Sea, and some have established permanent settlements in the southern of Sulawesi where they are locally known as the Wajo Bugis due to their close historical relation with the Bugis ethnic group.

Ethnonym
The ethnonym of Bajo people is an endonym which referring to their native origin in the Bajo Island of Lesser Sunda Islands (Nusa Tenggara). The term later adopted in the southern Sulawesi language of Bugis as ᨅᨍᨚ, which literally means "[the] wood", referring to the material for making boats that are often used by the Bajo ethnic group to travel the sea across the Flores Sea region.

In English, these ethnic group sometimes also known colloquially as the Sulawesi Bajau to differentiate it with another group in the Nusantara ( 'Indonesian Archipelago' in Old Javanese) that bears similar-sounding name, such as the Bajau people of the Bajau Island in Riau Archipelago; however, both ethnic groups might clumped together under the Indonesian Bajau terminology.

History

Genetic study and research

A genetic study of Bajo ethnic group population in three regions of Derawan Islands, Kotabaru (South Kalimantan), and Kendari (Southeast Sulawesi) indicates that the origin of the Bajo was from southern region of Sulawesi, this is in line with the oral tradition of the locals of Wajo Regency. The ethnogenesis of the Bajo is thought to predominantly arose in the  4th century AD when the native of Bajo Island in Lesser Sunda Islands started to migrate to northern region in Flores Sea and practiced intermarriage with the Bugis from Sulawesi and Papuans from New Guinea. Some researcher stated that the Bajo began to migrate to the island of Borneo (known natively as Kalimantan) around the 11th century AD by first settled in East Kalimantan via the Derawan Islands, and then headed to North Kalimantan and later to southern of the Philippines around the 13th to 14th century where they are commonly referred as the Sama Bajau; it is suspected that the Bajo were encouraged to migrate during the increasing influence and trading activity of the Palembang-origin empire of Srivijaya in the northern Makassar Strait area of Sulawesi Sea (the Srivijayan traders who settled in the Philippines later known as the Visayans and regarded as 'the indigenous' by the modern country of Philippines despite of its historical origin; the Philippines' municipality region of Palimbang also named after the capital of Srivijaya, which is the Palembang city in southeastern Sumatra).

Subethnic groups 
According to the native Bajo sociogrouping, there are at least four classifications of society which form the sub-groups that can be classified through the way how they usually wander the Flores sea and its surroundings:

 Pallibu, the Bajo who had the habit of going to sea only for a day and the distance is relatively close. They used a Soppe boat which can be driven by oars. After getting the fishes, they return to their homeland to sell their catch or enjoy it with their families.

 Papongka, the Bajo who went for a week or couple of weeks to wander the sea. They use the same type of boat as the Palibu group; which is a Soppe boat. If they feel that they have obtained enough catch or run out of clean water, they will stop by the nearest islands. After selling the fish they caught and getting clean water, they will return to the sea, and the cycle will repeat continuously. 

 Sakkaiʼ, the Bajo who are characterized by the usage of large boat called Leppa and spent longer time in sea (at least a month or two). The Leppa boat itself specifically can even accommodate a family and the necessities of daily life while at sea, and nowadays the Leppa equipped with engines as well. However, the Sakkai are not much different from the Papongka group, but Sakkai have greater reach of 'working areas'. 

 Lamme, the Bajo who can be categorized by the adoption of modern techniques of fishing. They use large boats with large crews and powerful engines. They crossed the high-tide seas and even reach another countries (mostly neighbouring countries of Indonesia). And they can be in the ocean for months.

References

Notes

Bibliography

See also 
 Bugis
 Wajo Regency

Further reading 

Ethnic groups in Indonesia